Johannes Anton Hieronymus Rhode (1903-1954), known professionally as Hiero Rhode, was a German type designer.

Fonts Designed
 Humboldt Fraktur (1938, Stempel Type Foundry), named after the German researcher Alexander von Humboldt.  Digitized by Helzel, Delbanco (2001, as DS Humboldt Fraktur), Gerhard Helzel, and Dieter Steffmann (2002).
 Humboldt Fraktur halbfett (1938)
 Humboldt Fraktur Bierbuchftaben (1938)
 Hiero Rhode Roman (1945, Johannes Wagner Type Foundry), matching italic by Karl Hans Walter.
 Hiero Rhode Roman fett (1945)
 Hiero Rhode Antiqua (1944, Johannes Wagner Type Foundry), digitized by Ari Rafaeli (2006).
 Hiero Rhode Antiqua fett (1946)

References

1903 births
1954 deaths
German typographers and type designers